B. tuberculatus may refer to:
 Bottosaurus tuberculatus, an extinct crocodile species from the Paleocene
 Brachychiton tuberculatus, the meayacka, a plant species in the genus Brachychiton
 Bufo tuberculatus, a toad species endemic to China

See also
 Tuberculatus